The 2016 season was Liam Kearns's first year as manager of the senior Tipperary county football team.

Tipperary recorded their first victory over Cork in the Munster Senior Football Championship since 1944 and reached the All-Ireland semi-finals for the first time since 1935.

In November 2015, Liam Kearns had been named as the new manager of the senior Tipperary county football team.

Intersport/Elverys continued as sponsors of Tipperary GAA for the second year. The Tipperary jersey for the 2016 season was the same as was used in 2015 and displayed the Intersport brand name on the front and their co-sponsor Elvery’s name on the back.

On 3 November 2016, Michael Quinlivan won Tipperary's first All-Star award since 2003, being picked in the full-forward position. Evan Comerford, Robbie Kiely, Peter Acheson, and Conor Sweeney were also nominated. Josh Keane and Jimmy Feehan were also nominated for the All Stars Young Footballer of the Year award.
Quinlivan became just the second Tipperary footballer to claim an All Star, joining Declan Browne who won the awards in 1998 and 2003.

Squad

Management
Manager: Liam Kearns
Selectors: Shane Stapleton, Tommy Toomey, Paul Fitzgerald

Competitions

National Football League

Munster Senior Football Championship

Summary
In June 2016, Tipperary reached the Munster final after a 3-15 to 2-16 win against Cork. They lost the Munster final to Kerry by 3-17 to 2-10 in a game which was shown live on RTÉ One.

 Tipperary's last victory over Cork in the Munster Senior Football Championship was in 1944.

All-Ireland Senior Football Championship

Summary
Tipperary went on to defeat Derry by 1-21 to 2-17 in round 4A of the qualifiers to reach the All Ireland Quarter-finals for the first time.
On 31 July 2016, Tipperary defeated Galway  by 3-13 to 1-10 in the 2016 All-Ireland Quarter-finals at Croke Park as they reached their first All-Ireland semi-final since 1935.

On 21 August 2016, Tipperary were beaten in the semi-final by Mayo on a 2-13 to 0-14 scoreline.
In the first half of the match Robbie Kiely received a black card after ten minutes for pulling on the jersey of Jason Doherty which the referee David Coldrick deemed as a cynical foul. Former players including Jim McGuinness and Peter Canavan have said that the black card was a wrong decision by the referee.
The Derry game was shown live on Sky Sports with the Galway game shown live on RTÉ One. The Mayo game was shown live on RTÉ One and Sky Sports.

See also
 2016 Tipperary county hurling team season

References

External links
Tipperary GAA Archives 2016
Tipperary GAA at Hogan Stand
Tipperary Player Profiles for 2016

Tipperary
Tipperary county football team seasons